Pandora is a 2016 South Korean disaster film written and directed by Park Jung-woo, starring Kim Nam-Gil. The film was released in South Korea on December 7, 2016.

Plot
Jae-hyeok is a young man who works at the local nuclear power plant, which is the only thing providing the town with energy, and also provides most of the jobs. Jae-hyeok lives with his mother, sister in law, and nephew Min-jae. Jae-hyeok, who lost both his father and brother to radiation in his early years, wishes to leave the town and the plant behind him and work on a fishing vessel to make money for his family, but is discouraged by everyone he knows.

Pyeong-seok is a member of the plant, who tries to get the president to shut down the plant, but he dismisses the claims, saying nothing will happen. One night, the animals of the town mysteriously run into the water.

Then, the next day, while Jae-hyeok is working, an earthquake suddenly strikes the town, causing one of the nuclear reactors to overheat. Attempts to cool it down are botched, as water does nothing to stop it, and that due to the reactor's age, coolant valves were too severely damaged to be fixed in time. Meanwhile, the president and his government debate allowing the reactor to vent radioactive particles into the air to relieve pressure from the core. The President insists on evacuating at least those closest to the reactor first. This backfires when the reactor stack explodes from the pressure as the workers were too late to try and vent steam into the air, leading to a full nuclear meltdown. As the workers attempted to flee, the whole basement caves in, killing or injuring most of the crew. Jae-hyeok is one of the few to get out, and continues to get people to safety, until he collapses from nuclear radiation.

Meanwhile, the KCDC quarantines the town's residents not far from the reactor. After Jae-hyeok's girlfriend, Yeon-joo, gets proof that the reactor exploded and delivers the news, the KCDC locks the town's residents in the evacuation center and put up an internet jammer, rendering their phones useless. Yeon-joo spreads the word and later the residents manage to break out and get back in the buses to continue evacuating. Back at a local hospital, situations grow tense as Jae-hyeok's health continues deteriorating, the medical team runs out of medical supplies and almost all the nurses have abandoned the sick and injured as public authorities also abandon the town, but he and several others were saved as one nurse had decided to stay and treat the injured. Despite the firefighters' efforts, the reactor is not cooling down and some firefighters start to suffer from radiation poisoning. Upon discovering that spent fuel rods are losing coolant due to the damage it sustained by the earthquake, the only option is to send a team in to seal the cracks of the tank to prevent coolant from escaping.

Jae-hyeok, though initially resentful with the government for their negligence, reluctantly agrees to a suicide mission with his crew, calling a distraught Yeon-joo before getting on a bus back to the town. Jae-hyeok remembers his childhood times before the nuclear disaster, before coming to the plant. With the crack underneath the coolant tank growing bigger during the mission, and no time left, Jae-hyeok suggests they blow up the tank to allow the spent fuel rods to fall into the basement, effectively creating a new tank.

However, because of the growing cracks, there is no time to set up the bombs and then seal the door; both of these steps must be done all at once, meaning that one will not be leaving out alive. Jae-hyeok; the only person who knows how to detonate bombs out of all others, willingly goes in. Having been exposed to too much radiation, he knows there is no hope going out alive, nor the time to live, and he chooses to sacrifice himself to save his other workers and his family and stop the disaster. He allows the workers to seal himself into the waste room and flee the area. In his final moments, Jae-hyeok uses his helmet-mounted camera to broadcast a farewell message to his family and Yeon-joo before blowing up the tank, killing himself in the process.

Cast
 Kim Nam-gil as Kang Jae-hyeok, the childish protagonist, who works at the nuclear power plant
 Kim Young-ae as Mrs. Seok- the mother of Jae-Hyeok, who owns a restaurant and lost her husband and other son to a similar accident
 Kim Ju-hyeon as Yeon-joo, Jae-hyeok's fiance, who works as a tour guide at the power plant. She is also Jae-hyeok's childhood friend
 Jung Jin-young as Pyeong-seok, one of the heads of the plant, who grows more concerned about safety of the plant
 Moon Jeong-hee as Jung-hye, Jae hyeok's sister in law and a widow who lost her husband (Jae hyeok's brother)
 Kim Dae-myung as Gil-seop, one of Jae Hyeok's friends, who aids Jae Hyeok in the nuclear mission
 Lee Geung-young as Prime Minister
 Kang Shin-il as Mr. Kong, a grumpy old nuclear power plant worker and father of Gil-seop
 Yoo Seung-mok as Mr. Kam- the other power plant head, who suspects something is off about the plant
 Joo Jin-mo as Minister
 Song Yeong-chang  as New Director
 Kim Young-woong as Mr. Hwang
 Kim Myung-min as South Korean President
 Kim Hye-eun as First Lady
 Oh Ye-sul as New Nurse

Release
Pandora is the first Korean film that has been pre-sold to Netflix. In November 2016, three weeks before the theatrical release, the company acquired exclusive international rights for streaming  Pandora in 190 countries.

Awards and nominations

See also
 Fukushima 50

References

External links

Pandora at Naver Movies 

South Korean action drama films
South Korean disaster films
2016 films
2016 action drama films
2010s disaster films
Films directed by Park Jung-woo
Next Entertainment World films
2010s South Korean films